Ulrich Wernitz (21 January 1921 – 23 December 1980) was a Luftwaffe flying ace of World War II. He was credited with 101 aerial victories—that is, 101 aerial combat encounters resulting in the destruction of the enemy aircraft—claimed in roughly 240 combat missions. He served in the post World War II German Air Force of the Federal Republic of Germany, retiring with the rank of Oberstleutnant (Lieutenant Colonel).

Career
Wernitz was born in Schweinitz/Herzberg in the district of Wittenberg, a Province of Saxony, on 21 January 1921. Following flight training, he was posted to 3. Staffel (3rd squadron) of Jagdgeschwader 54 (JG 54—54th Fighter Wing) in April 1943. At the time, JG 54 was based on the northern sector of the Eastern Front.

Nicknamed Pipifax by his comrades, he claimed his first aerial victory on 2 May 1943 over a Lavochkin La-5 fighter aircraft near Pushkin during the Siege of Leningrad. On combat missions, he frequently flew as wingman to Otto Kittel, Hermann Schleinhege and Günther Scheel.
Wernitz claimed his 82nd aerial victory, a Petlyakov Pe-2 shot down on 28 August 1944. He then fell ill in September. During his convalescence, Feldwebel (Sergeant) Wernitz, was awarded the Knight's Cross of the Iron Cross on 29 October 1944, and the German Cross in Gold on 1 January 1945. He returned to his unit in early February 1945, which at the time was fighting in the Courland Pocket. He was then appointed Staffelführer (squadron leader) of 3. Staffel of JG 54 and claimed 19 further aerial victories, including eight on 8 March 1945. On 26 March 1945, Wernitz was credited with his 100th aerial victory. He was the 100th Luftwaffe pilot to achieve the century mark.

Following World War II, Wernitz served in the German Air Force of the Federal Republic of Germany, retiring with the rank of Oberstleutnant (Lieutenant Colonel). He died on 23 December 1980.

Summary of career

Aerial victory claims
According to US historian David T. Zabecki, Wernitz was credited with 101 aerial victories. Mathews and Foreman, authors of Luftwaffe Aces — Biographies and Victory Claims, researched the German Federal Archives and state that Wernitz was credited with 101 aerial victories, all of which claimed on the Eastern Front.

Victory claims were logged to a map-reference (PQ = Planquadrat), for example "PQ 36 Ost 00333". These sectors were then subdivided into 36 smaller units to give a location area 3 × 4 km in size.

Awards
 Iron Cross (1939) 2nd and 1st Class
 Honorary Cup of the Luftwaffe on 17 April 1944 as Feldwebel and pilot
 Knight's Cross of the Iron Cross on 29 October 1944 as Feldwebel in the 4./Jagdgeschwader 54
 German Cross in Gold on 1 January 1945 as Feldwebel in the 3./Jagdgeschwader 54

Notes

References

Citations

Bibliography

 
 
 
 
 
 
 
 
 
 
 

1921 births
1980 deaths
Luftwaffe pilots
German World War II flying aces
German Air Force personnel
Recipients of the Gold German Cross
Recipients of the Knight's Cross of the Iron Cross
Military personnel from Saxony-Anhalt